Cylindera umbropolita is a species of tiger beetle found in India. It was originally described as a subspecies of Cicindela belli.

References 

umbropolita